Ligia baudiniana is a woodlouse in the family Ligiidae. It has a coarsely granular surface and large eyes that are very close together.

Distribution
L. baudiniana has been found from Bermuda to the Yucatán Peninsula and south to Panama.

Behavior
They cannot live in seawater for extended periods, as can L. oceanica, for example. They survive best in moist environments, but cannot survive in fresh water, most likely due losing their vital salts via dilution.

To hydrate, they turn away from the water and dip their uropods in the water and oscillate the distance between the uropodal spines to draw water up onto their gills. When it rains, they come out en masse several feet from the shore.

L. baudiniana feeds primarily on the unicellular green algae that coat intertidal rocks, rasping them off with a vertical movement of the front half of its body.

L. baudiniana changes coloring, lighter or darker, based on its background.

References

External links

Woodlice
Crustaceans described in 1840
Taxa named by Henri Milne-Edwards